Nebria snowi is a species of ground beetle from the Nebriinae subfamily that is endemic to Kuril Islands, Russia.

References

snowi
Beetles described in 1889
Beetles of Europe
Endemic fauna of Russia